Sariwŏn is the capital of North Hwanghae Province, North Korea.

Population 
The city's population as of 2008 is 307,764.

Administrative divisions
Sariwŏn is divided into 31 tong (neighbourhoods) and 9 ri (villages):

Healthcare
Sariwŏn has the only pediatric hospital (founded by Hungarians in the 1950s) in the entire region; it serves 16 districts and 500,000 children and teens annually.

Industry
Sariwŏn has a Potassic/Potash Fertilizer Complex and a tractor factory.

Education
Several institutions of higher education are based in Sariwŏn, including the Kye Ung-sang University, the Sariwŏn University of Geology, the Sariwŏn University of Medicine, the Sariwŏn University of Education no. 1 & no. 2, and the Sariwŏn Pharmaceutical College of Koryŏ.

Tourism

The "Sariwŏn Folklore street" was constructed during Kim-Jong-il's rule. Built to display an ideal picture of ancient Korea, it includes buildings in the "historical style" and a collection of ancient Korean cannons. Although it is considered an inaccurate romanticized recreation of an ancient Korean street, it is frequently used as a destination for foreigners on official government tours. Many older style Korean buildings exist in the city.

In 2020, Jongbangsan Hotel opened after several years of delays in construction. It has three main buildings and includes a gym and a swimming pool.

Transport
Sariwŏn is served by Sariwŏn Ch'ŏngnyŏn and several other stations on both the P'yŏngbu and Hwanghae Ch'ŏngnyŏn lines of the Korean State Railway.

Sariwŏn has a trolleybus system with two Ikarus 280T articulated trolleybuses; they are converted from diesel Ikarus 280 buses due to the lack of roof equipment. Regular trolleybuses were mothballed at the depot from 2020. The service is supplemented by regular buses.

Climate
Sariwŏn has a humid continental climate (Köppen climate classification: Dwa).

Sister cities
  Lahore, Pakistan
  Rafael Lara Grajales, Mexico

References

Further reading
Dormels, Rainer. North Korea's Cities: Industrial facilities, internal structures and typification. Jimoondang, 2014.

External links 

 Information about the potassic/potash fertilizer complex
 Basic statistics about Sariwon
 News about Sariwon's pediatric hospital
 Photo of entrance to the city
 Photo of a street scene
  Photo of a street scene
 City profile of Sariwon
 Folk Street in Sariwon picture album at Naenara
 Tour of Sariwon

 
Cities in North Hwanghae